The Atlantic City Marathon is the third oldest active marathon in the United States. It typically takes place the third weekend in October.

Course 

Races
 Atlantic City Marathon
 Atlantic City Half Marathon
 Atlantic City 10K
 Atlantic City 5K
 Atlantic City Boardwalk Run 5 Miler
 Atlantic City April Fools Half Marathon and 8K

Notes

References

External links

Sports in Atlantic City, New Jersey
Marathons in the United States